The concert overture In Nature's Realm, Op. 91, B. 168, was written by Antonín Dvořák in 1891.  It is the first part ("Nature") of a "Nature, Life and Love" trilogy of overtures written by Dvořák. The other two parts of the trilogy are the Carnival Overture, Op. 92 ("Life") and Othello, Op. 93 ("Love").

The overture is scored for two flutes, two oboes, English horn, two clarinets, bass clarinet, two bassoons, four horns, two trumpets, three trombones, tuba, timpani, triangle, cymbals and strings.

References

External links

Compositions by Antonín Dvořák
Concert overtures
1891 compositions